Archibald Noel Skelton (1 July 1880 – 22 November 1935) was a Scottish Unionist politician, journalist and intellectual.

Early life 
The son of Sir John Skelton KCB LLD, Skelton was born on 1 July 1880 at Hermitage of Braid in Edinburgh and was educated at Glenalmond College, the University of Edinburgh and at Christ Church, Oxford, to which he won a history scholarship. He was placed in the Second Class in the School of Modern History in 1902 and in 1906 he was called to the Scottish Bar and therefore joined the Faculty of Advocates. Skelton was respected as a lawyer, but he dealt mainly with divorce cases and those involving disputed wills. In 1920, he was appointed Junior Counsel to the Post Office and to the Board of Inland Revenue in 1921. In the First World War, Skelton served with the Scottish Horse as a Lieutenant, Captain and latterly a Major in Gallipoli, Salonika and France, where he was seriously wounded in the last weeks of the war.

Political career 
Skelton first stood for Parliament at the second general election of 1910, but he lost the East Perthshire Division to his Liberal opponent. Despite his defeat, Skelton remained active in politics, speaking frequently from Unionist platforms across Scotland. He was opposed to Irish Home Rule, but he was more progressive on issues like land reform, industrial relations and the use of the referendum. At the end of the Great War, Skelton stood aside and allowed the Coalition candidate in East Perthshire to be elected unopposed. However, he was elected Member of Parliament for the new Perth Division in 1922, although he lost the constituency a year later to a Liberal.

Constructive conservatism 
Skelton was a talented journalist and wrote frequently for The Spectator, including four articles in April and May 1923 under the heading "Constructive Conservatism". These lively articles set out his political philosophy—chiefly the pursuit of a property-owning democracy, the division of land into small-holdings, co-partnership and share options to improve industrial relations and finally the use of referendums to resolve disputes between the House of Commons and House of Lords—as well as urge the Unionists to compete with Labour on more typically socialist issues like pensions and housing. The four Spectator articles were republished as a pamphlet in 1924 which had a lasting influence, particularly among younger Tory MPs.

YMCA 
Skelton was re-elected for Perth in 1924 and again in 1929. He quickly struck up friendships with the Conservative MPs like Anthony Eden, Harold Macmillan, Robert Boothby, John Buchan and Oliver Stanley and became the intellectual leader of a Parliamentary grouping dubbed the YMCA by cynical older Parliamentarians. The group lobbied to make sure that Prime Minister Stanley Baldwin resisted the influence of reactionary elements in the Conservative Party and instead implemented progressive legislation. Baldwin was sympathetic and it was soundings with the YMCA which prevented Baldwin backing a controversial Political Levy Bill which would have had disastrous consequences for United Kingdom trade union relations. Skelton also maintained the group's journalistic presence, writing several articles for The Spectator, the Quarterly Review and the English Review.

Scottish Office 

Skelton switched to the Scottish Universities constituency in 1931 and was returned unopposed. That same year, he was appointed Parliamentary Under-Secretary of State for Scotland with responsibility for health, housing and education. He was a talented administrator but occasionally pedantic when intervening in Commons debates.

By 1935, Skelton was terminally ill with cancer and after several weeks in a nursing home died in Edinburgh on 22 November 1935. The declaration for the Scottish Universities constituency was made three days later and Skelton was re-elected posthumously.

Skelton was cremated and his ashes were buried in Dean Cemetery with his sister. A separate memorial lies in the old churchyard in Kinross on the edge of Loch Leven.

Influence 
Although Skelton died at the relatively young age of 55, he had once been seen as a potential Conservative leader and certainly as a senior Cabinet minister. Although he was quickly forgotten among the wider public, his influence, as Harold Macmillan wrote in his memoirs, "on politics and political thinking must have grown steadily year by year". His thinking on property ownership as the fundamental basis of modern conservatism proved particularly attractive and Anthony Eden personally revived the phrase as a political slogan at the 1946 Conservative Party conference. Macmillan then used it as the intellectual basis for the 1950s house-building boom while his successor as Prime Minister Sir Alec Douglas-Home owed his early political career to Skelton as his PPS from 1931 to 1935.

References 
 Torrance, David, Noel Skelton and the Property Owning Democracy (Biteback 2010)
 Torrance, David, The Scottish Secretaries (Birlinn 2006)
 Thorpe, D.R., Alec Douglas-Home (London 1996) & Eden (London 2003)
 Green, E.H.H., Ideologies of Conservatism (Oxford 2002)
 Young, Kenneth, Sir Alec Douglas-Home (London 1970)
 Tweedsmuir, Lady, John Buchan by his Wife and Friends (London 1947)

External links 
 
 Let us at least give house-room to property tax idea – The Herald article, dated 9 November 2006
 Prices on the up but homes ideal has its downside – Edinburgh Evening News article, dated 16 November 2006

1880 births
1935 deaths
British Army personnel of World War I
Members of the Parliament of the United Kingdom for the Combined Scottish Universities
UK MPs 1922–1923
UK MPs 1924–1929
UK MPs 1929–1931
UK MPs 1931–1935
Scottish Horse officers
Members of the Faculty of Advocates
Alumni of Christ Church, Oxford
Alumni of the University of Edinburgh
Politicians elected posthumously
People educated at Glenalmond College
Deaths from cancer in Scotland
Unionist Party (Scotland) MPs